Larry Holmes vs. Muhammad Ali, billed as "The Last Hurrah!", was a professional boxing bout contested on October 2, 1980 in Las Vegas for the WBC and vacant The Ring heavyweight championships.

Background
Larry Holmes was Ali's sparring partner for a long time. "He lived with Ali. They boxed hundreds of rounds. Look for Ali to decision Holmes," said Rollie Schwartz, past national chairman of the AAU Boxing Commission prior to the fight.

After defeating Leon Spinks to regain the WBA heavyweight title on September 15, 1978, Ali announced his retirement in June 1979. On February 14, 1980, Ali told the Associated Press that he was 75 percent sure that he would return to the ring. On March 5, he agreed to fight John Tate, the new WBA heavyweight champion, in a bout tentatively scheduled for June. However, Tate lost the title to Mike Weaver by a 15th-round knockout on March 31. At a press conference on April 16, Ali said he would fight WBC Champion Larry Holmes. The announcement came as a surprise, as the press conference was billed as a contract-signing for a bout between Ali and Weaver. Ali said negotiations for a Weaver fight fell apart the previous night when Weaver's promoter, Bob Arum, issued new demands that "were totally unacceptable."

On April 28, it was officially announced that Ali and Holmes would box on July 11 in Rio de Janeiro at the 165,000-seat Maracana Stadium. Promoters Don King and Murad Muhammad said Ali would get $8 million and Holmes would receive $4 million. However, the announcement came as a surprise to the boss of the stadium, who said it was "all new to me." Rio de Janeiro State Sports Superintendent Ricardo Labre said, "The chances are 99.9 percent against the bout being held here." He said setting up the ring, seats and other equipment "would destroy our grass. This is a soccer field." The bout was officially called off on May 12. Ali made $250,000 and Holmes $100,000 in forfeit money. After the cancellation, Holmes signed to fight Scott LeDoux, whom he stopped in seven rounds on July 7.

On July 17, 1980, Ali and Holmes signed to fight on October 2 at Caesars Palace in Las Vegas. Promoter Don King said Ali would be paid $8 million and Holmes $6 million. Caesars Palace constructed a temporary 24,790-seat outdoor arena for the fight. The live gate was $6 million, a record for that time.

Due to concerns for Ali's health, the Nevada State Athletic Commission had the former champion examined at Minnesota's Mayo Clinic as a prerequisite to being granted a boxing license. Ali checked into the clinic on July 23, 1980. His neurological exam was conducted by Dr. Frank Howard, whose report contained the following information: Ali showed a slight degree of missing when he tried to touch his finger to his nose, he had difficulty in coordinating the muscles used in speaking, and he did not hop on one foot with expected agility. However, Dr. Howard determined that there were no specific findings to prohibit Ali from fighting. The Mayo Clinic report was forwarded to the Nevada State Athletic Committee, but it was not made public at that time. Based on the report, Ali was granted a license to box in Nevada.

Ali overused the medication Thyrolar while training, which probably contributed to his sluggish performance during the fight.

The fight
There were no knockdowns, but Holmes dominated the fight and was given every round by all three judges. Holmes won through a technical knockout after Ali's trainer Angelo Dundee stopped the fight after the tenth round.

Criticism
According to the Telegraph: According to Ferdie Pacheco, Ali's former ring doctor, "All the people involved in this fight should've been arrested. This fight was an abomination, a crime." Pacheco had earlier quit Ali's camp, in 1977, after Ali's fight with Earnie Shavers. Pacheco claims he had sent Ali's medical results to Angelo Dundee, Jabir Herbert, Muhammad Ali, and Veronica Porché Ali noting that "This is what's happening to you. If you want to continue, you have no shot at a normal life." Pacheco said he received no reply from the recipients to his warning.

In 2012 Ali met Pacheco for the last time and told him "you was right", something he had said to Pacheco several times before. According to Pacheco after Ali's death in 2016:

Undercard
Saoul Mamby bested Maurice Watkins by unanimous decision to retain his WBC Super Lightweight Championship.
Former heavyweight champion Leon Spinks knocked out Bernardo Mercardo at 2:52 of round nine.
Michael Dokes knocked out Tom Fisher at 1:17 of round seven.
Larry Holmes' brother Mark Holmes bested Randy Rivers in a six-round unanimous decision. 
Ronnie Smith bested Danny Cruz in a four-round unanimous decision.

References

Holmes
World Boxing Council heavyweight championship matches
1980 in boxing
Boxing in Las Vegas
1980 in sports in Nevada
October 1980 sports events in the United States
Caesars Palace
Nicknamed sporting events